Standard frequency and time signal service (short: SFTS) is, according to Article 1.53 of the International Telecommunication Union's (ITU) Radio Regulations (RR), "A radiocommunication service for scientific, technical and other purposes, providing the transmission of specified frequencies, time signals, or both, of stated high precision, intended for general reception".

Classification
In accordance with ITU Radio Regulations (article 1) variations of this radiocommunication service are classified as follows:
Standard frequency and time signal service  (article 1.53)
 Standard frequency and time signal-satellite service

In general this radiocommunication service  uses radio stations as follows:
Standard frequency and time signal stations (article 1.95)

Frequency allocation
The allocation of radio frequencies is provided according to Article 5 of the ITU Radio Regulations (edition 2012).

In order to improve harmonisation in spectrum utilisation, the majority of service-allocations stipulated in this document were incorporated in national Tables of Frequency Allocations and Utilisations which is with-in the responsibility of the appropriate national administration. The allocation might be primary, secondary, exclusive, and shared.
primary allocation: is indicated by writing in capital letters (see example below)
secondary allocation: is indicated by small letters

 Example of frequency allocation

Time signals in use 
The following are the known HF time signal stations currently operational.

United States 
The Standard Time and Frequency Signal (STFS) is a Radiocommunication service providing the transmission of specified frequency and time signal, of stated high precision, intended for general reception in the United States and beyond. The radio signals are broadcast on very precise carrier frequencies by the U.S. Naval Observatory and the National Institute of Standards and Technology (NIST), formerly the National Bureau of Standards (NBS). The technical specification of that particular service is in line to the provisions of the International Telecommunication Union's (ITU) Radio Regulations (RR)

See also 
 Time synchronization in North America
 Radio Clock
 Time_signal#Radio_time_sources

References

External links 
 NIST Time and Frequency Division
 NPL India Time and Frequency Standards

Radiocommunication services ITU
Standards
Time signals